1982
Soviet
Films